Bloodtide may refer to:

 Bloodtide (audio drama), a 2001 audio drama based on the British TV series Doctor Who
 Bloodtide (novel), a 1999 novel by Melvin Burgess
 Blood Tide, a 1982 British film directed by Richard Jefferies
 Bloodtide, a supervillain from Marvel Comics